The Superior Court of California, County of Madera, also known as the Madera County Superior Court or  Madera Superior Court, is the branch of the California superior court with jurisdiction over Madera County.

History
Madera County was partitioned from Fresno County in 1893.

The first Superior Court sessions in Madera were held on the upper floor of a drugstore until a permanent courthouse was completed in 1901. After a 1906 fire that destroyed the clock tower and upper floors, the courthouse was rebuilt and served the Superior Court and county offices until 1957, when they were relocated to the former Lincoln Elementary School, which was completed in 1913 and remodeled in 1955. The old courthouse remained vacant until 1971, when it was taken by the Madera County Historical Society and repurposed as a museum. In September 2015, the court was moved to its present location, adjacent to the County Administration Building. The new building was designed by the AC Martin company.

Venues

The courthouse is in Madera, the county seat. Since 1901, the sites all have been within one block of the old courthouse.

References

External links
 
 

Superior Court
Superior courts in California